The Rural Economy and Agriculture Committee of the African Union's Economic, Social and Cultural Council deals with:

 Rural economy
 Agriculture and food security
 Livestock
 Environment
 Natural resources
 Desertification

The Chairperson of the Committee is Patrick Kayemba.

Sectoral Cluster Committees of the Economic, Social and Cultural Council
Agriculture in Africa